Bowbrook House School  is a mixed independent school for around 200 pupils aged 3 to 16 with around 30 teaching staff. It is located in a Georgian  mansion set on a 14-acre campus in the village of Peopleton near the town of Pershore in England in the south-east of the county of 
Worcestershire.

Curriculum
Pupils follow a broad curriculum that includes national curriculum core subjects.

Sports
Sports played at the school  include athletics, badminton, basketball, cricket,  football, golf, hockey, martial arts, netball, rugby, swimming, and tennis. The school has an all-weather pitch, an art and technology centre, an athletics track, cricket nets, an IT suite, a library, science labs, an open-air swimming pool, and several tennis courts. The school plays sports fixtures against many other private schools in the area, and also sends representatives to ISA national competitions, where many pupils have enjoyed success.

Activities
The school's many activities include art, dance, chess, choir, debating, theatre studies, handicrafts, an orchestra/band, outdoor pursuits, skiing, textiles, and The Duke of Edinburgh's Award scheme.

Awards
The school is 2010 National Winner of the Independent School's Association Award for Excellence.

References

Private schools in Worcestershire